The Gdańsk Voivodeship was a voivodeship (province) of the Polish People's Republic from 1975 to 1989, and the Third Republic of Poland from 1989 to 1998. Its capital was Gdańsk, and it was centered on the region of Pomerelia. It was established on 1 June 1975, from the parts of the voivodeships of Gdańsk, and Bydgoszcz, and existed until 31 December 1998, when it was incorporated into then-established Pomeranian Voivodeship.

History 
The Gdańsk Voivodeship was established on 1 June 1975, as part of the administrative reform, and was one of the voivodeships (provinces) of the Polish People's Republic. It was formed from the part of the territory of the Gdańsk Voivodeship, and a one gmina (municipality) of the Chojnice County, Bydgoszcz Voivodeship. Its capital was located in the city of Gdańsk. In 1975, it had a population of 1 249 300 people.

On 9 December 1989, the Polish People's Republic was replaced by the Third Republic of Poland. In 1997, the voivodeship had a population of 1 464 800 people, and had an area of 7 394 km². It existed until 31 December 1998, when it was incorporated into then-established Pomeranian Voivodeship.

Subdivisions 

In 1997, the voivodeship was divided into 63 gminas (municipalities), including 16 urban municipalities, 5 urban-rural municipalities, and 42 rural municipalities. It had 21 cities and towns.

From 1990 to 1998, it was additionally divided into eight district offices, each comprising several municipalities.

Demographics

Leaders 
The leader of the administrative division was the voivode. Those were:
 1975–1979: Henryk Śliwowski;
 1979–1981: Jerzy Kołodziejski;
 1981–1987: Mieczysław Cygan;
 1988–1990: Jerzy Jędykiewicz;
 1990–1996: Maciej Płażyński;
 1996–1997: Henryk Wojciechowski;
 1998: Tomasz Sowiński.

Citations

Notes

References 

History of Pomerania
History of Gdańsk
20th century in Gdańsk
Former voivodeships of Poland (1975–1998)
States and territories established in 1975
States and territories disestablished in 1998
1975 establishments in Poland
1998 disestablishments in Poland